Cairo is a village in Allen County, Ohio, United States. As of the 2010 census it had a population of 524. It is included in the Lima Metropolitan Statistical Area.

History
Cairo was originally called West Cairo, and under the latter name was platted in 1848. A post office called West Cairo was established in 1852, and the name was changed to Cairo in 1922.

Geography
Cairo is located at the intersection of what was the east–west U.S. Route 30 (the Lincoln Highway) and the north–south State Route 65 ("Ottawa Road") in the middle of farming country. In the 1970s, Route 30 was upgraded and moved approximately one mile south of Cairo. Now, the east–west street in Cairo is Main Street. Cairo lies near the following city and towns:
 Lima, about six miles to the south on State Route 65
 Columbus Grove, about six miles to the north on State Route 65
 Gomer, about five miles to the west on the old Lincoln Highway route
 Beaverdam, about six miles to the east on the old Lincoln Highway route
The nearest stream with year-round flow is Rattlesnake Creek, which flows from south of the village and passes just to the west of the village. Water flow in the village is generally from the south and east to the north and west.

Demographics

2010 census
As of the census of 2010, there were 524 people, 198 households, and 150 families living in the village. The racial makeup of the village was 97.7% White, 0.6% African American, 0.2% Native American, 0.2% Asian, and 1.3% from two or more races. Hispanic or Latino of any race were 1.5% of the population.

There were 198 households, of which 37.9% had children under the age of 18 living with them, 58.1% were married couples living together, 14.1% had a female householder with no husband present, 3.5% had a male householder with no wife present, and 24.2% were non-families. 22.7% of all households were made up of individuals, and 11.1% had someone living alone who was 65 years of age or older. The average household size was 2.65 and the average family size was 3.10.

The median age in the village was 37.2 years. 28.2% of residents were under the age of 18; 7.7% were between the ages of 18 and 24; 24.1% were from 25 to 44; 27.2% were from 45 to 64; and 13% were 65 years of age or older. The gender makeup of the village was 46.6% male and 53.4% female.

2000 census
As of the census of 2000, there were 499 people, 181 households, and 148 families living in the village. The population density was 2,064.0 people per square mile (802.8/km2). There were 184 housing units at an average density of 761.1 per square mile (296.0/km2). The racial makeup of the village was 98.60% White, 0.40% African American, 0.20% Asian, and 0.80% from two or more races. Hispanic or Latino of any race were 0.80% of the population.

There were 181 households, out of which 40.9% had children under the age of 18 living with them, 65.2% were married couples living together, 12.7% had a female householder with no husband present, and 18.2% were non-families. 15.5% of all households were made up of individuals, and 7.2% had someone living alone who was 65 years of age or older. The average household size was 2.76 and the average family size was 3.08.

In the village, the population was spread out, with 30.7% under the age of 18, 6.8% from 18 to 24, 31.5% from 25 to 44, 21.4% from 45 to 64, and 9.6% who were 65 years of age or older. The median age was 34 years. For every 100 females there were 92.7 males. For every 100 females age 18 and over, there were 90.1 males.

The median income for a household in the village was $32,917, and the median income for a family was $39,375. Males had a median income of $34,250 versus $25,313 for females. The per capita income for the village was $14,365. About 6.8% of families and 6.9% of the population were below the poverty line, including 11.4% of those under age 18 and 3.8% of those age 65 or over.

Education
Cairo has a public library, a branch of the Allen County Library.

References

Villages in Allen County, Ohio
Villages in Ohio
1848 establishments in Ohio
Populated places established in 1848